Athanasios Aravositas (Greek: Αθανάσιος Αραβοσιτάς; 1903–1971) was a Greek sports shooter and athlete of Panathinaikos A.O. He competed at the 1936, 1948 and 1952 Summer Olympics.

References

1903 births
1971 deaths
Greek male sport shooters
Olympic shooters of Greece
Shooters at the 1936 Summer Olympics
Shooters at the 1948 Summer Olympics
Shooters at the 1952 Summer Olympics
Place of birth missing
Panathinaikos A.O.
Panathinaikos F.C. non-playing staff
Panathinaikos V.C. players
Panathinaikos shooters
20th-century Greek people